is a former Japanese football player. who is becoming the assistant coach of the Myanmar national football team.

Club career
Morishita was born in Shizuoka on 28 December 1960. After graduating from Tokyo University of Agriculture, he joined Yamaha Motors (later Júbilo Iwata) in 1983. The club won the league champions in 1987–88 and he was selected Best Eleven. He was also selected Japanese Footballer of the Year awards in 1987. In 1992, Japan Soccer League was folded and the club joined new league Japan Football League (JFL). The club won the champions in 1992 and 2nd place in 1993. The club was promoted to J1 League from 1994. He moved to JFL club Kyoto Purple Sanga in 1995. In 1995 season, the club won the 2nd place and was promoted J1 League. He retired in 1997. He played 313 games in the league.

National team career
On 4 June 1985, Morishita debuted for Japan national team against Malaysia. He also played at 1986 World Cup qualification in 1985. From 1986, he played as regular goalkeeper at 1986 Asian Games and 1988 Summer Olympics qualification in 1987. From 1988, although he deprived of regular goalkeeper by Shigetatsu Matsunaga, he played all matches included Asian Games in 1990. He played 28 games for Japan until 1991

Club statistics

National team statistics

Honors
Japanese Footballer of the Year: 1987
Japan Soccer League Best Eleven: 1987–88
Best Goalkeeper of the year (Japan Soccer League): 1987–88, 1989–90

References

External links
 
 Japan National Football Team Database
 

 Shinichi Morishita at library.footballjapan.jp 

1960 births
Living people
Tokyo University of Agriculture alumni
Association football people from Shizuoka Prefecture
Japanese footballers
Japan international footballers
Japan Soccer League players
J1 League players
Japan Football League (1992–1998) players
Júbilo Iwata players
Kyoto Sanga FC players
Footballers at the 1986 Asian Games
Footballers at the 1990 Asian Games
Association football goalkeepers
Asian Games competitors for Japan
J1 League managers
FC Tokyo managers